Plagemann is a surname. Notable people with the surname include:
Augusta Plagemann (1799-1888), Swedish artist
Jürgen Plagemann (born 1936), German rower
Nico Plagemann, half of German musical duo Kollektiv Turmstraße
 Stephen Plagemann, co-author of The Jupiter Effect